Jeffrey Peter Oliver (born July 28, 1965) is a former American football player. He played college football for the Boston College Eagles and spent one season in the National Football League with the New York Jets.

Living people
People from Delhi, New York
American football offensive guards
American football offensive tackles
Boston College Eagles football players
New England Steamrollers players
New York Jets players
1965 births